The Battle of Halmstad, also known as the Battle at Fyllebro, was fought on August 17, 1676, at Fyllebro, approximately five kilometres south of the town of Halmstad in the province of Halland in southwest Sweden. It was the last battle in Halland between Denmark and Sweden.

Prelude
King Christian V and the Danish army that landed at Råå near Helsingborg in Scania in late June 1676 managed to conquer almost the whole province in less than a month. The Swedish army had to retreat north to Växjö.

In early August, Major General Jacob Duncan, a native Scot, was sent north, to Halland, with about 4,000 Danish troops to take the key-town of Halmstad and if possible advance further north to join forces with General Ulrik Frederick Gyldenløve, who had reached Gothenburg with a Norwegian army and was threatening to besiege the city. 

On August 10, King Charles XI of Sweden received information that Duncan was moving towards Halmstad. On August 11, he and his field army headed west to intercept Duncan. On August 12, Duncan laid siege to Halmstad. King Christian soon informed him of the Swedish troop movements and ordered Duncan to retreat to the town of Laholm. Before the Danes got to Laholm, the Swedes had destroyed the bridge over the River Lagan which meant that it would become difficult for the Danes to retreat further south. Now, the Danes rested overnight and set out for the Fyllebro bridge. At an earlier stage, Duncan had destroyed the bridge to prevent the Swedes from crossing. Now, Duncan ordered his men to repair the bridge. Early in the morning of August 17, the Swedish army seized the road between Halmstad and Laholm, cutting off Duncan's way south. Duncan mistakenly thought that he was he was dealing with small scouting parties because there were no infantry troops to be seen. He had sent out scouts who not only made contact with the Swedish cavalry but joined their rear without being recognised, but they had not spotted the infantry.

Battle
When Duncan's troops crossed the River Fylleån, General Rutger von Ascheberg and 600 Swedes moved forward against the Danes.The Swedish vanguard under Ascheberg's command had already encountered a small Danish unit that was heading north. After a short chase, Ascheberg found himself face-to-face with Duncan and his forces.  The bridge was too small and narrow to let Duncan's men retreat en masse. Unaware of the danger he let his troops assume battle formations on the south bank with their backs against the stream. Duncan sent his infantry and dragoons forward, under artillery cover against the Swedish infantry that was just arriving. Now, the Swedish army moved swiftly forward. 7,000 Swedes against 3,500-4,000 Danes. At noon of August 17, Duncan was trapped. 
 

The battle started with a salvo from the few Swedish cannons, whereupon Charles XI and his Household cavalry charged down the hills to attack the Danish left wing. Soon the Swedes also charged on the left wing and in the centre. After 15 minutes, the Danish left wing was scattered. In the centre, the Danish infantry put up a determined fight, with a powerful counter-attack from a cavalry unit that tried to break through the Swedish lines, but only one squadron made it through.

At this point, Duncan had realized his mistake and ordered his remaining troops to retreat back across the bridge. But the Swedish cavalry on the right-wing found a ford and started moving fresh cavalry squadrons across the creek. Understanding that the battle was lost, Duncan surrendered. The action probably lasted for little more than an hour, although some Swedish sources claimed it only lasted a quarter of an hour.<Essen, p.119.> What can definitely be established is that it was a brief and intense battle. 

The Danish losses were heavy: 1,000 had died and 2,000 were taken prisoner. Out of these latter, 469 men accepted enrolment in the Swedish army instead. The Danish sources report large numbers of wounded being carted to the army hospital in Helsingborg and causing chaos in the small town - exactly how many wounded were taken there is not certain. 

The Swedes only lost 185 men of whom 3 officers and 38 common soldiers were dead, according to the Swedish sources. This corresponds quite well with the Danish sources that state that 150 Swedes were taken prisoner and brought to Helsingborg.

Aftermath
The defeat at Halmstad dealt a hard blow to the Danish plans to advance north and join forces with the Norwegian army. The day after the battle the Danish King Christian V broke camp and left Kristianstad and started marching towards Halmstad. On September 5 he reached Halmstad and laid siege to the town with no result. Three weeks later he returned to Scania to prepare winter quarters.

The Battle of Fyllebro was also 20-year-old Charles XI's first major victory. It was an important morale boost for him, his generals, and the whole Swedish army. The army was still much too weak to confront the Danes in Scania and marched north to Varberg to await more troops.

See also
Scanian War
History of Scania

References

Sources

Conflicts in 1676
1676 in Denmark
1676 in Sweden
Battles involving Sweden
Battles involving Denmark
Scanian War